Stanton Hill is a village in the Ashfield district of Nottinghamshire.

History

Skegby Colliery, owned by the Dodsley family, was originally located on Wharf Road, which is now in the area known as Stanton Hill, but in the first half of the 19th century was just part of Skegby. It was situated near a triangular piece of land known as Gore Field.

Stanton Hill was first mentioned in the census in 1871, and then only as a street within Skegby. It probably took its name from the Stanton Ironworks Company, which started sinking the Teversal (Butcher Wood) Colliery in 1867, and later the Silverhill Colliery in 1878. Many of the workers for these new collieries moved from other coalmining areas including Shropshire, Staffordshire, Derbyshire, and Leicestershire.

Skegby Colliery was replaced by New Skegby Colliery (later renamed Sutton Colliery) in 1873. It was also known as Brierley Colliery, possibly renamed by the many Staffordshire colliers moving from the Brierley Hill area. This was later taken over by the Blackwell Colliery Company.

The huge increase in population of Skegby – from 805 in 1869 to over 3,000 in 1884 – meant that new housing was required in the immediate area. One hundred and thirty-two houses were initially built on Cooperative Street, Institute Street and Cross Row by the Stanton Ironworks Company, beginning in 1877. However, these street names only developed later, because in 1881 they were all recorded as Stanton Hill. By 1881 Stanton Hill was described as a hamlet within the parish of Skegby.

Two years after the sinking of Silverhill Colliery the Stanton Ironworks Company acquired more land at Meden Bank, on which were built a further one hundred and twenty cottages and allotments for the workforce.

The Blackwell Colliery Company also contributed to the housing in the Stanton Hill area, building the terraces of houses named Longden, Bainbridge, Marshall, Gardiner, Cochrane and Scott's. These streets were named after some of the Directors of the Blackwell Company at the time of construction.

All Saints' Church was built in 1899.

Notable residents

An original band member of The Honeycombs who had a hit with Have I the Right in 1964 was Stanton Hill guitarist Alan Ward. Alan was living on Brand Lane when he answered an advertisement in the New Musical Express, asking musicians to audition by writing to Joe Meek.
John Lawrence Froggatt footballer
George Poyser footballer
Reg Holland footballer
Alan Woodward Grimsby Town FC footballer 1970-1973

References

External links

 https://www.facebook.com/groups/11764920038/
 http://forebears.io/england/nottinghamshire/skegby/stanton-hill#sid23093

Villages in Nottinghamshire
Ashfield District